Thomas Edward (1814–1886) was a Scottish naturalist born in Gosport. He was trained as a shoemaker and eventually settled in Banff, where he devoted his leisure time to the study of animal nature, and collected numerous specimens of animals, which he stuffed and exhibited, but with monetary loss. Samuel Smiles, his biographer, describes him as "one of those men who lived for science, not by science."

The Queen's attention being called to his case, she settled on him an annual pension of £50, while the citizens of Aberdeen presented him in March 1877 with a gift of 130 sovereigns (£130).

The story of his life and work was recorded in Life of a Scotch Naturalist, Thomas Edward, associate of the Linnean Society, written by Samuel Smiles, illustrated by George Reid and published by John Murray in 1876 (nine editions were published between 1876 and 1889). His portrait is held in the National Portrait Gallery.

Edward contributed to The Zoologist over a long period. For instance in 1859 he wrote a small notice about the "occurrence of the Great Ash-coloured Shrike (Lanius excubitor) in Banffshire." In 1877 he wrote messages about "Asterina gibbosa on the coast of Banffshire" and about the "Bearded Tit and Hawfinch in Aberdeenshire."

References

Sources 
  (review in: The Zoologist, 3rd series, vol 1 (1877), issue 2, February—section 'Notices of New Books,' pp. 71–76.)

1814 births
1886 deaths
Scottish naturalists
Shoemakers